Youth Political Awareness PAC is a nonpartisan Political Action Committee or 527 organization founded and operated by a staff of teenagers in San Diego, California. Youth Political Awareness PAC was established as a non-connected PAC by the Federal Election Commission in September 2014. Youth Political Awareness PAC is an ideological PAC that supplements kindergarten-8th grade civic education.

Leadership
Chairman Justin Donovan and Chief of Staff Sam Haber are the Co-founders of Youth Political Awareness PAC, along with a governing board of directors who manage distinct departments in the organization.

Education
Education is the largest department in Youth Political Awareness PAC and is led by the director Christa Hoffman. Youth Political Awareness PAC's education department visits and guides local civics classrooms through supplemental classroom simulations. The PAC, within its first two months, has been able to reach over 200+ students each month.

Official supporters
Youth Political Awareness PAC has received official support from local politicians and educators including: 
 Former Vice President Joe Biden
Kevin Faulconer, San Diego Mayor
 Scott Peters, congressional representative (CS-52)
Carol Kim, former educator, San Diego city council candidate (district 6)

Youth Political Awareness PAC discloses that its supporters do not reflect the political affiliation of the PAC.

Links

2014 establishments in California
527 organizations
Organizations based in San Diego
United States political action committees